Olenecamptus olenus is a species of beetle in the family Cerambycidae. It was described by Gahan in 1904.

References

Dorcaschematini
Beetles described in 1904